The Aviamilano F.14 Nibbio (as in the bird) is a four-seat, single engine cabin monoplane built in Italy in the late 1950s. Only ten production aircraft were completed.

Design and development

Designed by Stelio Frati, the Nibbio is a conventionally laid out, cantilever low wing monoplane, seating four in two rows.  It is a scaled-up version of Frati's successful two seat F.8 Falco.  The Nibbio has a wooden structure and is mostly plywood skinned with fabric overall, though the rear control surfaces have only fabric covering.  The single spar wing, which is straight tapered and square tipped carries electrically operated split flaps and has 5° of dihedral.

The fuselage is a two-part monocoque structure, bolted together.  The rear surfaces are tapered and straight edged; the elevator has a flight adjustable trim tab.  Forward, the upper fuselage line merges into that of the cabin glazing over a baggage space behind the rear bench seat.  The front seats have dual control.  Cabin access is via a starboard side door.  The Nibbio is powered by a 180 hp (134 kW) Lycoming O-360 air-cooled four cylinder horizontally opposed engine, fed fuel from one fuselage and two wing tanks. It has an electrically retractable tricycle undercarriage with hydraulic brakes and a steerable nosewheel. The main legs are wing mounted and retract inwards.

The Nibbio flew for the first time on 16 January 1958.

Operational history
After the prototype, Aviamilano built ten production Nibbios.

By 2010 only two Nibbios remained on the European civil aircraft registers, one in Italy and one in the UK.

Specifications

References

1950s Italian sport aircraft
Low-wing aircraft
Single-engined tractor aircraft
Aircraft first flown in 1958